Lee Han-bin (born September 25, 1988) is a South Korean short track speed skater. He won the bronze medal by becoming third overall at the 2008 World Junior Championships in Bolzano.

Education
Korea National Sport University
Seongnam Seohyun High School
Seongnam Hatap Middle School

External links
 ISU profile
 2008 ISU World Junior Championships, Italy

Lee Han-bin Fancafe at Daum 

1988 births
Living people
South Korean male short track speed skaters
Olympic short track speed skaters of South Korea
Short track speed skaters at the 2014 Winter Olympics
Korea National Sport University alumni
Speed skaters from Seoul
21st-century South Korean people